Turnaround is a live album by American pianist Joanne Brackeen recorded at Sweet Basil Jazz Club in 1992 and released on the Evidence label in 1995.

Reception 

AllMusic reviewer Scott Yanow stated "Brackeen is in top form ... The explorative music holds one's interest throughout".

Track listing 
All compositions by Joanne Brackeen except where noted.
 "There Is No Greater Love" (Isham Jones, Marty Symes) – 9:39
 "Rubies and Diamonds" – 8:57
 "Picasso" – 16:17
 "Bewitched, Bothered and Bewildered" (Richard Rodgers, Lorenz Hart) – 9:12
 "Turnaround" (Ornette Coleman) – 10:27
 "Tricks of the Trade" – 10:44

Personnel 
Joanne Brackeen – piano
Donald Harrison – alto saxophone
Cecil McBee – bass
Marvin "Smitty" Smith – drums

References 

Joanne Brackeen live albums
1995 live albums
Evidence Music live albums